Leonard Marion Bahr (May 12, 1905 – July 25, 1990) was an American portrait painter, muralist, illustrator and educator. He worked for many years as a painting professor at the Maryland Institute College of Art (MICA).

Personal life
Leonard Marion Bahr was born on May 12, 1905 in Maryland.

He married Florence E. Riefle, who had been a student at Maryland Institute (now Maryland Institute College of Art), in 1934 and they had three children, Beth, Leonard, and Mary.  Leonard died July 25, 1990.

Artist
Bahr created realistic landscape paintings, still lifes and portraits.

Portraits and paintings with people
In 1930, Leonard started his professional painting career while still a student, beginning with two portraits of Baltimore's Mayor Preston. He made portraits of Bishop Noble C. Powell, various doctors and administrators at Johns Hopkins Hospital, and other prominent individuals. The State of Maryland commissioned him to replicate the historical portrait, by John Wollaston, of Daniel Carroll, which is now located on the first floor of the Maryland State House.

Bahr made a painting of his brother, Maurice, at work underneath a Ford Model T automobile. Within the "rough grained" wood frame was a painting made of gray, black and dark brown oil paint. After the initial exhibition at the Baltimore Museum of Art, it traveled in a labor and art tour across the United States.

Biblical themes
A Christian, Bahr painted Biblical themes, including Christ in War (1964) and an altar painting of Christ at Gethsemane for Our Savior's Evangelical Lutheran Church in Lansdowne, Maryland. He made an illustrated book of his drawings depicting the 23rd Psalm of David that was published in 1933.

Murals

Bahr painted murals for the Public Works of Art Project (1933–34). In 1934 he made the mural of Mary Caroll (Polly) Caton, daughter of lawyer, statesman and Contintental Congress representative Charles Carroll. The mural entitled Arrival of Mary Carroll Caton at Castle Thunder was made for the Catonsville High School library. In it, she arrived at the Caton Manor Estate, which was her father's gift to her when she married Richard Caton. It is "presumedly" her husband who greeted her as she exited the carriage. The high school was renovated in the 1960s and the mural was lost in the process. The same year, he made Slaves Rolling Hogsheads of Tobacco Down a Road for the school's library. In it, slaves are rolling casks of tobacco to Elkridge Landing on Rolling Road. Historically slaves rolled the tobacco hogsheads from farms to the Elkridge Landing seaport on the Patapsco River where they would be shipped. A preliminary drawing for the library murals is held at the Smithsonian. He made two more murals for the Baltimore Municipal Aquarium at Druid Hill Park.

World War II
His service as Lt. Commander in the Navy during World War II, included illustrating Navy life for various military magazines.

Other information
In April 1933, Bahr exhibited at the first annual exhibition of the Maryland Painters, Sculptors and Printmakers at the Baltimore Museum of Art.

Leonard served on art boards and juries and exhibited his work widely, winning many prizes for his artistic eye. Articles about him or his works were published in American Artist, The Appalachian South, Gardens Houses and People, The Baltimore Sun Magazine, and the Baltimore Sun.

Maryland photographer Emily Hayden took a series of photographs of Bahr painting outdoors, which are in the Maryland Historical Society archives. In December 1980 and January 1981, Maryland Institute College of Art held a retrospective of his fifty years as a painter. In the 1980s he was filmed for a video entitled "A Painter's Portrait."

Educator
Bahr taught beginning and advanced painting classes at the Maryland Institute College of Art for more than 50 years, beginning when he was an undergraduate. He taught day and night classes on the weekdays and Saturdays for much of his career. In 1980, he retired with honors for service. Two years later, he was still teaching one painting class in the fall and spring semesters. Bahr also gave private lessons.

Collections
Leonard's history and artworks have been published and are in private and public collections, including the Academy Art Museum in Easton, Maryland; University of Arizona; the Peabody Conservatory of Music; the Baltimore Museum of Art; the Corcoran Gallery of Art; and the Elkridge Heritage Society.

Works
The following is a selected list of Bahr's works. There are images and information for dozens more works with the Maryland State Archives.

Portraits

 Miss Ruth Baetjer, Union Memorial Hospital, 1974
 Daughter of Dr. and Mrs. Willem Bosma, 1977, Private collection
 Daniel Carroll (1730-1796), oil on canvas, 48 x 38", 1975, Maryland State House, First Floor, Room 107
 The Demuth Children, 1970, The H.E. Demuth Jr. Collection
 Ellen, 1974, Private collection
 May Garrettson Evans, (1866-1947), oil on canvas, 38 x 28", 1947, Peabody Art Collection.
 Dr. George Finney, Johns Hopkins Hospital, 1973
 Florence, 1930
 Mary, 1964
 Mary in Robe, 1948, Private collection
 Nude in Wicker Chair, 1970
 The Rt. Rev. Bishop Noble C. Powell,  Episcopal Diocese of Maryland, 1963
 Unknown Man, 1939
 Lois Crawford Winslow, 1939
 Norbert Witt, Noxell Corporation, 1973
 The Seers: Ambrose & Olga Worrall, 1965

Landscapes

 Locust Grove, 1980
 Rain Squall and Sun, 1972
 Rushing Water, 1955
 Valley Landscape, 1970

Other works

 Ballerina Resting
 Big Chair, 1978
 Death and Transfiguration, 1965
 Girl in Straw Hat
 Good Earth, 1952
 Louisiana Belle, 1946
 Pink House, 1936
 Red Cloth, 1960

References

1905 births
1990 deaths
20th-century American painters
American people of German descent
American male painters
American muralists
American portrait painters
Artists from Baltimore
Public Works of Art Project artists
People from Elkridge, Maryland
Maryland Institute College of Art faculty
American illustrators
20th-century American male artists